Old Overholt is America's oldest continually maintained brand of whiskey, was founded in West Overton, Pennsylvania, in 1810. Old Overholt is a rye whiskey distilled by A. Overholt & Co., currently a subsidiary of Beam Suntory, which is a subsidiary of Suntory Holdings of Osaka, Japan. It is produced at the Jim Beam distillery in Clermont, Kentucky. It is one of the most commonly available straight rye whiskies in the United States, where it is available at most liquor stores. It is aged for four years and since early 2020 is non-chill filtered and bottled at 86 proof (43% alcohol by volume). A four-year bottled in bond, 100 proof version was released in late 2017. Old Overholt has been called a "foundation stone of American whiskey" because of its long history.

History

Early years
Henry Oberholzer (Anglicized to "Overholt"), a German Mennonite farmer, moved to West Overton, Pennsylvania, on the banks of Jacobs Creek in Western Pennsylvania in 1800. His family came from the area of Germany which specialized in distilling "korn", or rye whiskey, and Henry took up the tradition.

Growth
In 1810, Henry's son Abraham Overholt (1784–1870) took over management of the distillery and made it into a business. By the 1820s, the distillery was putting out 12 to 15 gallons of rye whiskey per day. Abraham grew the company rapidly; by 1843, Baltimore newspapers were advertising Overholt's "Old Rye"; at that time, only the very few top distilleries were advertised by name. By 1859, Overholt incorporated his business as "A. Overholt & Co." He operated out of a new distillery building that was six stories high, 100 feet long, and which could produce 860 gallons per day.

In 1881, Abraham's grandson Henry Clay Frick took over the company. As one of the country's wealthiest people, the distillery was a sentimental side-business for Frick. Frick took on Andrew Mellon and one Charles W. Mauck as partners, each owning one-third of the business.

In 1888, Mauck adopted the name "Old Overholt" as the official name of the company, adding a picture of Abraham as the logo. Around that time, the company started selling its product in bottles instead of barrels. By 1900, Old Overholt became a national brand. In the early years of the 20th Century, Old Overholt became one of the largest and most respected whiskeys in the country.

Frick died in December 1919 and left his share to Andrew Mellon. This ended family ownership in the company.

Prohibition

The national prohibition of alcohol in 1920 hit most American breweries and distilleries hard, putting many out of business. Perhaps because of its association with Mellon, who was then secretary of the treasury under Warren G. Harding, Old Overholt was able to secure a permit for selling medicinal whiskey. This permit allowed Overholt to sell existing whiskey stocks to druggists for medicinal use.

In 1925, under pressure from prohibitionists, Mellon sold his share of the company to a New York grocer, thus ending local ownership. The company was sold again in 1932 to National Distillers Products Co., which owned more than 200 brands.

War and decline
During World War II, Overholt and other whiskey distilleries were ordered by the government to make industrial alcohol. After war's end, whiskey fell out of favor with the American public generally, as drinkers switched to vodka. Rye whiskey especially fell out of favor, and by the 1960s, Old Overholt was the only nationally distributed straight rye whiskey. The brand struggled through the 1970s as sales continued to decline. In 1987, Old Overholt was sold to the James B. Beam Distilling Company, a subsidiary of American Brands, which moved production to Kentucky. Later the Jim Beam division was acquired by Suntory.

Since December 2015, Old Overholt and Old Grand-Dad, both of which are Beam Suntory brands, have been marketed together as "The Olds".
A four-year bottled in bond, 100 proof version was released in late 2017.

In popular culture
Old Overholt is closely associated with the Old West, particularly Tombstone, Arizona and is served in "Old West" tourist saloons in Tombstone today.

The brand was parodied in a Warner Brothers cartoon, various issues of MAD Magazine and in the Terry Pratchett novels The Dark Side of the Sun and Soul Music as "Old Overcoat".

The Old Overholt distillery was a plot element at the end of season 3 of Boardwalk Empire.  The distillery was part of a deal between Andrew Mellon and Enoch "Nucky" Thompson, who persuaded him to let him manage it in order to implicate Jess Smith and George Remus.

Famous drinkers
Overholt is said to have been the alcoholic beverage of choice for notables ranging from Old West gunfighters to US presidents including Ulysses S. Grant and John F. Kennedy, and Secretary of State John Foster Dulles.

Reviews
Food critic Morgan Murphy said "This very old brand of rye whiskey needles the drinker with zings of fruit flavors, grain bite, and sweet cereal notes."

Whisky writer Jim Murray said "creamy nose...citrus notes...very hard rye...momentarily moist and sweet before going on to perfect the driest, crispest finish of its genre".

See also
 Henry Overholt
 Jacobs Creek (Pennsylvania)
 West Overton, Pennsylvania

References

External links

Old Overholt Brand Page
Whisky Magazine: Old Overholt tasting profile 

Rye whiskey
Beam Suntory
1810 establishments in Pennsylvania
American companies established in 1810